

Offseason
August 19: Incoming freshman Kendall Coyne was selected for the United States squad that will compete in the 2011 IIHF 12 Nations Tournament series to be contested from August 24–31, in Vierumäki, Finland.
Sept.13: Head coach Dave Flint announced that the Huskies will have three captains for the upcoming season. Dani Rylan, Stephanie Gavronsky and Casey Pickett were selected.

Recruiting

Exhibition

Regular season
On January 15, Northeastern will participate in The Bog in Kingston, Mass. Their opponents will be the Providence Friars.

Standings

Schedule

Conference record

Awards and honors
Kendall Coyne, Hockey East Rookie of the Week (Week of October 31, 2011)
Kendall Coyne, Hockey East Rookie of the Week (Week of November 28, 2011)
Kendall Coyne, Hockey East Player of the Month (Month of December 2011)
Kendall Coyne, Hockey East Rookie of the Week (Week of January 23, 2012)
Lucie Povová, Hockey East Co-Rookie of the Week (Week of October 24, 2011)
Florence Schelling, Hockey East Goaltender of the Month (Month of October 2011)
Florence Schelling, Hockey East Defensive Player of the Week (Week of November 7, 2011)
Florence Schelling, Hockey East Co-Defensive Player of the Week (Week of January 23, 2012)
Florence Schelling, Hockey East Defensive Player of the Week (Week of February 6, 2012)
Florence Schelling, Runner-Up, Hockey East Defensive Player of the Month (Month of January 2012)
Northeastern Huskies, Hockey East Team of the Week (Week of January 23, 2012)

Hockey East 10th Anniversary Team
 Chanda Gunn, selection
 Florence Schelling, Honorable Mention

References

Northeastern
Northeastern Huskies women's ice hockey seasons